Diego Rodolfo Placente (born 24 April 1977) is a former Argentine footballer who played as a left-back.

Club career 
Born in Buenos Aires, Placente started playing professionally in 1996 with Argentinos Juniors, before moving to Argentine giant River Plate in 1997. He transferred to Bayer 04 Leverkusen in 2001, where he played until 2005 when his contract expired. Subsequently, he turned down an offer from English club Everton FC to join Celta de Vigo. While at Leverkusen he played in the 2002 UEFA Champions League Final.

In 2008, he returned to Argentina to play for San Lorenzo de Almagro. In the 2008 summer transfer window, he transferred to the French side of Bordeaux, and penned a two-year contract. After finishing that contract, he returned to San Lorenzo on a free transfer.

International career 

He played his first match with the Argentina national football team in 2001, and was capped 22 times.

Career statistics

International

Personal life 
Placente is married and his wife is Jewish. Because of this, he was subject of transfer talk to Israeli club Maccabi Tel Aviv. It was his wife though who was uninterested in moving to Israel, and the transfer never took place.

Honours

Club 
River Plate
Argentina Primera Division: 1997 Apertura, 1999 Apertura, 2000 Clausura
Supercopa Libertadores: 1997

Bayer Leverkusen
DFB-Pokal Runner-up: 2001–02
UEFA Champions League Runner-up: 2001–02

Bordeaux
Ligue 1: 2008–09
Trophée des Champions: 2008, 2009
Coupe de la Ligue: 2009

Nacional
Uruguayan Primera División: 2012

International 
Argentina U-20
South American Youth Championship: 1997
FIFA U-20 World Cup: 1997

Argentina
Copa América: Runner-up 2004
FIFA Confederations Cup: Runner-up 2005

References

External links 
 
 
 Argentine Primera statistics at Fútbol XXI  
 
 Leverkusen who's who 

1977 births
Living people
Footballers from Buenos Aires
Argentine footballers
Argentine expatriate footballers
Argentina youth international footballers
Argentina under-20 international footballers
Argentina international footballers
Club Atlético River Plate footballers
San Lorenzo de Almagro footballers
Argentinos Juniors footballers
Bayer 04 Leverkusen players
RC Celta de Vigo players
FC Girondins de Bordeaux players
Club Nacional de Football players
Ligue 1 players
La Liga players
Bundesliga players
Argentine Primera División players
Uruguayan Primera División players
Expatriate footballers in France
Expatriate footballers in Germany
Expatriate footballers in Spain
Expatriate footballers in Uruguay
2002 FIFA World Cup players
2004 Copa América players
2005 FIFA Confederations Cup players
Argentine expatriate sportspeople in France
Argentine expatriate sportspeople in Germany
Argentine expatriate sportspeople in Spain
Association football defenders